This is a list of airports in Sudan, sorted by location.

Sudan, officially the Republic of the Sudan, sometimes called North Sudan is an Arab state in North Africa. It is bordered by Egypt to the north, the Red Sea to the northeast, Eritrea and Ethiopia to the east, South Sudan to the south, the Central African Republic to the southwest, Chad to the west, and Libya to the northwest. The Nile divides the country into eastern and western halves. The capital city is Khartoum. The country is divided into 18 states.



Airports 

Airport names shown in bold indicate the airport has scheduled service on commercial airlines.

See also 
 List of airports in South Sudan
 List of airports by ICAO code: H#HS - Sudan and South Sudan
 Transport in Sudan
 Wikipedia:WikiProject Aviation/Airline destination lists: Africa#Sudan

References 
 
  - includes IATA codes
 Great Circle Mapper: Airports in Sudan - IATA and ICAO codes
 World Aero Data: Airports in Sudan - ICAO codes
 List of Sudan Airports with Google Maps

Sudan
 
Airports
Airports
Sudan